The J. Clarence Kind House, at 751 Marsh Ave. in Reno, Nevada, United States, is an historic Tudor Revival-style house that was built in 1934.  Also known as the William Forman Home, it was listed on the National Register of Historic Places (NRHP) in 2005.

It is a large,  house. According to its NRHP nomination, it was deemed significant "for its role in Reno's community planning and development history" and "as an excellent local example of the Tudor/Cotswold Cottage style of architecture, within the broader category of Period Revival, and as representing the work of two local master architects, Russell Mills and Edward Parsons."

References

Houses in Reno, Nevada
Cotswold architecture
Houses completed in 1934
Houses on the National Register of Historic Places in Nevada
National Register of Historic Places in Reno, Nevada
Tudor Revival architecture in Nevada
1934 establishments in Nevada